Ping is the Mandarin pinyin romanization of the Chinese surname written  in Chinese character. It is romanized P'ing in Wade–Giles. Ping is listed 95th in the Song dynasty classic text Hundred Family Surnames. It is not among the 300 most common surnames in China in 2008.

Notable people
 Ping Dang (平當; died 4 AD), Han dynasty chancellor
 Ping Yan (平晏; died 20 AD), son of Ping Dang, Xin dynasty government minister
 Ping An (平安; died 1409), Ming dynasty general, adopted son of the Hongwu Emperor
 Ping Hailan (平海澜; 1885–1960), educator, co-founder of Utopia University
 Ping Fan (平凡; 1920–1999), Hong Kong actor
 Ping Hsin-tao (平鑫濤; born 1927), Taiwanese publisher and filmmaker, husband of Chiung Yao
 Ping Yali (平亚丽; born 1961), long jumper, first Chinese Paralympic gold medalist
 Ping An (平安; born 1978), singer

People from elsewhere with the surname
 Jean Ping (born 1942), Gabonese diplomat and Chairperson of the Commission of the African Union
 Nimrod Ping (1947–2006), politician in Brighton, England

References

Chinese-language surnames

Individual Chinese surnames